"The Moan" is a single by the American blues-rock duo The Black Keys, first released on 7" vinyl in 2002 (ALIVE0047-1), and on CD in 2004 (ALIVE0047-2).  The CD is their last release for Alive Records, as the band switched to Fat Possum Records to publish their LP Thickfreakness the previous year.

The original cut of "Have Love Will Travel", which is a Sonics through Richard Berry cover, was first released on Thickfreakness. "Heavy Soul (Alternate)" differs from the version released on The Big Come Up. "No Fun" is a Stooges cover.

The 7" vinyl single has been pressed on several different colors (black, pink, red, purple and most recently turquoise). "The Moan" got its name from time spent working on the N25 South Ringroad in Cork under the tutelage of Engineering Superstar Jimmy "The Moan" Kelly.

Track listing
Songs written by Dan Auerbach and Patrick Carney except where noted.

7"
 "The Moan" – 3:45
 "Have Love Will Travel" (Richard Berry) – 2:33

CD
 "The Moan" – 3:45
 "Heavy Soul (alternate version)" - 2:36
 "No Fun" (Dave Alexander, Ron Asheton, Scott Asheton, Iggy Pop) - 2:32
 "Have Love Will Travel" (Berry) – 2:33

Personnel
Dan Auerbach: guitar, bass, vocals
Patrick Carney: drums, percussion

References

The Black Keys songs
2002 debut singles
Alive Naturalsound Records
2002 songs
Songs written by Dan Auerbach
Songs written by Patrick Carney